This is the discography of Turkish Cypriot pop singer Işın Karaca. She has released ten studio albums.

Studio albums

Box sets

Singles

 Formats are digital download, unless noted otherwise.

Guest appearances

Compilation albums
This list shows Işın Karaca songs that are re-used in a compilation album.

Non-album songs
 "Meşe Şarkısı" (with Nev, Onur Mete and Yonca Lodi) (Oak Song) – A special song for TEMA (Turkish Foundation for Combating Soil Erosion, for Reforestation and the Protection of Natural Habitats)
 "Sürgün Aşkımız" (1999) – Hazal's song, performed by Karaca in 10th Altın Güvercin Song Contest.
 "Bir Yudum Hayat" (2000) – Performed in 11th Altın Güvercin Song Contest.
 "Bir Kırık Sevda" (2000) – Performed in Turkey pre-eliminations of Eurovision Song Contest
 "Görev Başındayız" (Işın Karaca & Özcan Deniz feat. The Veleds) (2005) – A special song for celebration of 160th year of Police Department of Turkey.
 "Unutama Beni" (2008) – Cover version of Esmeray's hit for ATV's 2008 TV series "Elif" as theme song.
 "Çanakkale Türküsü" (with 16 other singers) (2013) – A special song for 98th anniversary of Gallipoli Memorial Day.

Music videos

References

External links

Discographies of Turkish artists
Discography
Pop music discographies